Charlie Brown's Wind Up can mean any of several miniature swing rides for children, at these Cedar Fair parks:

Locations
 Charlie Brown's Wind Up at Carowinds
 Charlie Brown's Wind Up at Cedar Point
 Charlie Brown's Wind Up at Dorney Park & Wildwater Kingdom
 Charlie Brown's Wind Up at Kings Island
 Charlie Brown's Wind Up at Valleyfair
 Charlie Brown's Wind Up at Worlds of Fun